Juan Carlos Burgos Castillo (born December 26, 1987) is a Mexican professional boxer. He's nicknamed Miniburgos after his uncle, who is a former world champion Víctor Burgos. Juan Carlos is the top ranked Featherweight by the WBC.

Professional career
Burgos scored a twelfth round stoppage over Juan Carlos Martinez in a Featherweight bout in Laredo, Texas. With his win over Martinez on ESPN Burgos is now ranked #2 by the WBC.

WBC Featherweight Championship
He fought Ricardo Castillo on May 28, 2010, scoring a tenth round TKO over Castillo.

Following the Elimination Bout, Burgos lost to the former WBC Bantamweight Champion Hozumi Hasegawa, for the vacant WBC Featherweight Title at the Nippon Gaishi Hall in Japan on November 26, 2010.

Martinez vs. Burgos Controversy

WBO lightweight title holder Roman Martínez and Burgos fought to a draw on January 19, 2013 with most people believing that Burgos had won an easy unanimous decision. However; the fight turned out to be a split draw. One judge scored it 116-112 (8 rounds to 4 for Martínez), 114-114, and one judge scoring it for Burgos. According to the official punch stats, Burgos outlanded Martínez by 93 overall punches and 70 power punches.

Professional boxing record

|- style="margin:0.5em auto; font-size:95%;"
| style="text-align:center;" colspan="8"|33 Wins (21 knockouts), 3 Losses, 2 Draws
|-  style="text-align:center; margin:0.5em auto; font-size:95%; background:#e3e3e3;"
|  style="border-style:none none solid solid; "|Res.
|  style="border-style:none none solid solid; "|Record
|  style="border-style:none none solid solid; "|Opponent
|  style="border-style:none none solid solid; "|Type
|  style="border-style:none none solid solid; "|Rd., Time
|  style="border-style:none none solid solid; "|Date
|  style="border-style:none none solid solid; "|Location
|  style="border-style:none none solid solid; "|Notes
|- align=center
|Loss || 30-2-2  ||align=left| Mikey García
| ||   ||  ||align=left| 
|align=left|
|- align=center
|Draw || 30-1-2  ||align=left| Yakubu Amidu
| ||   ||  ||align=left| 
|align=left|
|- align=center
|Draw || 30-1-1  ||align=left| Román Martínez
| ||   ||  ||align=left| 
|align=left|
|- align=center
|Win || 30-1  ||align=left| César Vázquez
| ||   ||  ||align=left| 
|align=left|
|- align=center
|Win || 29-1  ||align=left| Cristobal Cruz
| ||   ||  ||align=left| 
|align=left|
|- align=center
|Win || 28-1  ||align=left| Luis Cruz
| ||   ||  ||align=left| 
|align=left|
|- align=center
|Win || 27-1  ||align=left| Gilberto Sanchez Leon
| ||   ||  ||align=left| 
|align=left|
|- align=center
|Win || 26-1  ||align=left| Frankie Archuleta
|  ||   ||  ||align=left| 
|align=left|
|- align=center
|Loss || 25-1 ||align=left| Hozumi Hasegawa
|  ||  ||  ||align=left| 
|align=left|
|- align=center
|Win || 25-0 ||align=left|Ricardo Castillo 
| ||  ||  ||align=left| 
|align=left|
|- align=center
|Win || 24-0 ||align=left| Carlos Martinez
| ||  ||  ||align=left| 
|align=left|
|- align=center
|Win || 23-0 ||align=left| Yogli Herrera  
| ||  ||  ||align=left| 
|align=left|
|- align=center
|Win || 22-0 ||align=left| Vyacheslav Gusev 
| ||  ||  ||align=left| 
|align=left|
|- align=center
|Win || 21-0 ||align=left| Fernando Lizarraga  
| ||  ||  ||align=left| 
|align=left|
|- align=center
|Win || 20-0 ||align=left|Salvador Perez  
| ||  ||  ||align=left| 
|align=left|
|- align=center
|Win || 19-0 ||align=left| Andres Ledesma  
| ||  ||  ||align=left| 
|align=left|
|- align=center
|Win || 18-0 ||align=left| Rafael Urias  
| ||  ||  ||align=left| 
|align=left|
|- align=center
|Win || 17-0 ||align=left| Miguel Munguia
| ||  ||  ||align=left| 
|align=left|
|- align=center
|Win || 16-0 ||align=left| Tiburón Hernandez 
| ||  ||  ||align=left| 
|align=left|
|- align=center
|Win || 15-0 ||align=left| Adam Carrera
| ||  ||  ||align=left| 
|align=left|
|- align=center
|Win || 14-0 ||align=left| Moises Zamudio  
| ||  ||  ||align=left| 
|align=left|
|- align=center
|Win || 13-0 ||align=left| Rodolfo Garay 
| ||  ||  ||align=left| 
|align=left|
|- align=center
|Win || 12-0 ||align=left| Juan Rivera  
| || ||  ||align=left| 
|align=left|
|- align=center
|Win || 11-0 ||align=left| Manuel Castro  
| ||  ||  ||align=left| 
|align=left|
|- align=center
|Win || 10-0 ||align=left| Juan Velasquez  
| ||  ||  ||align=left| 
|align=left|
|- align=center
|Win || 9-0 ||align=left| Saul Lopez  
| ||  ||  ||align=left| 
|align=left|
|- align=center
|Win || 8-0 ||align=left| Pablo Bojorquez  
| ||  ||  ||align=left| 
|align=left|
|- align=center
|Win || 7-0 ||align=left| Carlos Valenzuela
| ||  ||  ||align=left| 
|align=left|
|- align=center
|Win || 6-0 ||align=left| Roberto Castro 
| ||  ||  ||align=left| 
|align=left|
|- align=center
|Win || 5-0 ||align=left| Jose Fernandez
| ||   ||  ||align=left| 
|align=left|
|- align=center
|Win || 4-0 ||align=left| Ramon Lazcano  
| || ||  ||align=left| 
|align=left|
|- align=center
|Win || 3-0 ||align=left| Jose Luis Alvarez 
| ||  ||  ||align=left| 
|align=left|
|- align=center
|Win || 2-0 ||align=left| Andres Macias  
| ||  ||  ||align=left| 
|align=left|
|- align=center
|Win || 1-0 ||align=left| Martin Borquez  
| ||  ||  ||align=left| 
|align=left|
|- align=center

See also
Notable boxing families

References

External links

1987 births
Living people
Mexican male boxers
Featherweight boxers
Super-bantamweight boxers
Boxers from Baja California
Sportspeople from Tijuana